The 2004 NASCAR Nextel Cup Series was the 56th season of professional stock car racing in the United States and the 33rd modern-era Cup series season. The season began on Saturday, February 7, and ended on Sunday, November 21. Kurt Busch, who drove a Ford for Roush Racing, was the Nextel Cup champion. It would be the last time until 2012 that the championship would be won by someone other than Tony Stewart or Jimmie Johnson.

This was the first season that NASCAR utilized the Chase for the Nextel Cup format that began with the Sylvania 300 on Sunday, September 19. Under the format rules, the top 10 drivers (and any additional drivers within 400 points of the leader) by the end of the 26th race would be eligible to compete in a final 10-race playoff to determine the NASCAR Nextel Cup champion. Following the 26th race, the eligible drivers would have their points reset to bring the drivers closer together in the standings, with only five points separating each driver. The season would then continue as normal, with the driver with the most points at the end of the season becoming the champion.

The NASCAR Manufacturers' Championship was won by Chevrolet when they captured 26 wins and 266 points. Ford finished in second place with 10 wins, and 224 points, while Dodge followed in third with 4 wins and 194 points.

This was the first year for the new series sponsorship. Mobile phone provider Nextel assumed sponsorship of the NASCAR championship series from cigarette brand Winston. Winston was the title sponsor of the Cup Series for 33 seasons, from 1971 to 2003. Nextel would become only the second title sponsor in Cup Series history. This was also the first year for Sunoco as it replaced Unocal 76 Brand as the official fuel of NASCAR. Sunoco would become only the second gas company to be NASCAR's official fuel since Unocal had been the official fuel since the sport's inception in 1948.

The season was also marked by tragedy. On October 24, a charter airplane owned by Hendrick Motorsports crashed at Bull Mountain in the Blue Ridge Mountains of Virginia, near Martinsville Speedway. Ten people aboard the plane died, including four relatives of team owner Rick Hendrick, as well as Randy Dorton, Hendrick's chief engine builder. Jimmie Johnson, a Hendrick driver, had won the race, but the post-race victory ceremony was canceled as words spread of the incident.

2004 was the first season without Pontiac (though a few Pontiacs without factory support ran several early-season races).

It was the last season until 2021 without Clint Bowyer and Reed Sorenson and the same time before Denny Hamlin joins NASCAR as a driver (he ran the last 7 races in 2005 before joining full-time in 2006).

Teams and drivers

Full-time schedule

Limited schedule

Schedule

Races

Budweiser Shootout 

The exhibition Budweiser Shootout was held on February 7 at Daytona International Speedway.

Top ten results

 88- Dale Jarrett
 8- Dale Earnhardt Jr.
 29- Kevin Harvick
 6- Mark Martin
 24- Jeff Gordon
 2- Rusty Wallace
 20- Tony Stewart
 5- Terry Labonte
 48- Jimmie Johnson
 01- Boris Said

Gatorade Twin 125s 

The Gatorade 125s qualifying for the Daytona 500 were held on February 12 at Daytona International Speedway.

Race one: top ten results
 8- Dale Earnhardt Jr.
 20- Tony Stewart
 42- Jamie McMurray
 15- Michael Waltrip
 99- Jeff Burton
 18- Bobby Labonte
 97- Kurt Busch
 77- Brendan Gaughan (R) 
 0- Ward Burton
 30- Johnny Sauter

Race two: top ten results
 38- Elliott Sadler
 40- Sterling Marlin
 48- Jimmie Johnson
 6- Mark Martin
 29- Kevin Harvick
 17- Matt Kenseth
 01- Joe Nemechek
 21- Ricky Rudd
 2- Rusty Wallace
 12- Ryan Newman

46th Daytona 500 

Greg Biffle won the pole.

Top 10 Results
 8-Dale Earnhardt Jr.
 20-Tony Stewart
 22-Scott Wimmer
 29-Kevin Harvick
 48-Jimmie Johnson
 01-Joe Nemechek
 38-Elliott Sadler
 24-Jeff Gordon
 17-Matt Kenseth
 88-Dale Jarrett
 Dale Earnhardt Jr. wins the Daytona 500 in his 5th attempt. He also scored the win on February 15, 6 years to the day that his father, Dale Earnhardt, won his only Daytona 500 in his 20th attempt.
 Michael Waltrip turned over early in this race in the grass.

Subway 400 

The final Subway 400 was held on February 22 at North Carolina Speedway. Ryan Newman won the pole.

 Complete results

Top ten results

 17- Matt Kenseth
 9- Kasey Kahne (R) 
 42- Jamie McMurray
 40- Sterling Marlin
 8- Dale Earnhardt Jr.
 12- Ryan Newman
 2- Rusty Wallace
 97- Kurt Busch
 0- Ward Burton
 24- Jeff Gordon - 2 laps down

Failed to qualify: none

 This was the final NASCAR Cup race held at Rockingham, which was dropped from the 2005 NASCAR schedule following the Ferko lawsuit and declining attendance.
 During the race, Carl Long went for a wild tumble down the back straight and Robby Gordon was turned into the wall and got on his side.
 The race also became the beginning of the focus of the season-long field-filler controversy. Joe Ruttman arrived at the track without a pit crew for a start and park, Andy Hillenburg was involved in a crash after running slow, and Kirk Shelmerdine was black-flagged for failing to maintain a minimum speed. NASCAR added a mandate of a full pit crew in an attempt to stop the start and park.
 NASCAR also announced, in light of the Super Bowl XXXVIII halftime show controversy, at the drivers' meeting that a points penalty would also be assessed to anyone involved on a race team who uses inappropriate language. Previously, a fine had been assessed.

UAW-DaimlerChrysler 400 

The UAW-DaimlerChrysler 400 was held on March 7 at Las Vegas Motor Speedway. Kasey Kahne won the pole.

 Complete results

Top ten results
 17- Matt Kenseth
 9- Kasey Kahne
 20- Tony Stewart
 42- Jamie McMurray
 6- Mark Martin
 38- Elliott Sadler
 41- Casey Mears
 18- Bobby Labonte
 97- Kurt Busch
 2- Rusty Wallace

 Kyle Busch made his NASCAR debut, finishing 41st.
 The finish saw Matt Kenseth score his second win in a row, as Kasey Kahne once again finished second.

Failed to qualify: Larry Gunselman (#98)

Golden Corral 500 

The Golden Corral 500 was held on March 14 at Atlanta Motor Speedway. Ryan Newman won the pole.

 Complete results

Top ten results
 8- Dale Earnhardt Jr.
 19- Jeremy Mayfield
 9- Kasey Kahne
 48- Jimmie Johnson
 12- Ryan Newman
 17- Matt Kenseth
 20- Tony Stewart
 16- Greg Biffle
 88- Dale Jarrett
 24- Jeff Gordon

Failed to qualify: Morgan Shepherd (#89)

Carolina Dodge Dealers 400 

The Carolina Dodge Dealers 400 was held on March 21 at Darlington Raceway. Kasey Kahne won the pole.

 Complete results

Top ten results
 48- Jimmie Johnson
 18- Bobby Labonte
 12- Ryan Newman
 31- Robby Gordon
 38- Elliott Sadler
 97- Kurt Busch
 6- Mark Martin
 29- Kevin Harvick
 19- Jeremy Mayfield
 8- Dale Earnhardt Jr.

Failed to qualify: Stanton Barrett (#94)

 This was the last 400-mile race held at Darlington until 2020.

Food City 500 

The Food City 500 was held on March 28 at Bristol Motor Speedway. Ryan Newman won the pole.

 Complete results

Top ten results

 97- Kurt Busch
 2- Rusty Wallace
 29- Kevin Harvick
 40- Sterling Marlin
 17- Matt Kenseth
 49- Ken Schrader
 12- Ryan Newman
 42- Jamie McMurray
 24- Jeff Gordon
 15- Michael Waltrip

Failed to qualify: Morgan Shepherd (#89)
Withdrew: Larry Foyt (#14)
 Larry Foyt attempted the race with the #14 team but the car was confiscated by NASCAR for failing opening day inspection for a non-approved roof that did not fit the car templates which led the team to withdraw.
 This was Kurt Busch's third straight win in a Cup event at Bristol, and third straight spring Bristol win.
 This marked the final race ever for Pontiac to be in a NASCAR Cup Series event. Hermie Sadler drove the 02 car for Pontiac's final ever race.

Samsung/Radio Shack 500 

The Samsung/Radio Shack 500 was held on April 4 at Texas Motor Speedway. Bobby Labonte won the pole for the final time in his career.
 Complete results

Top ten results

 38- Elliott Sadler
 9- Kasey Kahne
 24- Jeff Gordon
 8- Dale Earnhardt Jr.
 2- Rusty Wallace
 97- Kurt Busch
 41- Casey Mears
 20- Tony Stewart
 48- Jimmie Johnson
 42- Jamie McMurray

Failed to qualify: Kyle Busch (#84), Morgan Shepherd (#89), Andy Hillenburg (#80), Andy Belmont (#02)

 Elliott Sadler edged out Kasey Kahne by a .028 of a second.
 This was the last race attempted for Pontiac in the series. Andy Belmont failed to make the race. Carl Long, Andy Belmont, and Hermie Sadler however, did run a combined 4 races (which all 4 races were consecutive) in a Pontiac at the beginning of the season, driving the number 02 car for Sadler Brothers Racing, a single-car team. Carl Long raced the car at Las Vegas, then the next 2 weekends, Andy Belmont raced at Atlanta and Darlington, and finally, one week later, Hermie Sadler raced at Bristol. The Bristol race marked the final race ever for Pontiac, and those 4 races would be the final 4 races for Pontiac in NASCAR. Andy Belmont attempted Rockingham in February along with this race but failed to make both events. After failing to make this race, Pontiac left NASCAR for good. Pontiac left the sport with 3 Manufacturer's Championships (1961, 1962, and 1993), and scoring 154 career NASCAR wins. Rusty Wallace is the all-time winner in a Pontiac at 31. Only 4 drivers have won the Series Championship driving a Pontiac: Joe Weatherly (1962 and 1963), Rusty Wallace (1989), Bobby Labonte (2000), and Tony Stewart (2002).

Advance Auto Parts 500 

The Advance Auto Parts 500 was held on April 18 at Martinsville Speedway. Jeff Gordon won the pole.
 Complete results

Top ten results

 2- Rusty Wallace
 18- Bobby Labonte
 8- Dale Earnhardt Jr.
 48- Jimmie Johnson
 12- Ryan Newman
 24- Jeff Gordon
 42- Jamie McMurray
 17- Matt Kenseth
 40- Sterling Marlin
 88- Dale Jarrett

Failed to qualify: Kirk Shelmerdine (#72)

 On lap 284, the concrete pavement in turn 3 broke up, creating a pothole. Jeff Gordon would run into the broken up part of the track, damaging his race car. The race was red-flagged to repair the track, and while NASCAR would not grant the 24 team's request to be able to repair the car during the red flag, Gordon was able to fight back in the second half of the race for a sixth-place finish.
 Rusty Wallace broke a winless streak of 106 races, dating all the way back from April 29, 2001, at Auto Club Speedway.
 This would be the 55th and final career win for Rusty Wallace. With this win, he passed Lee Petty on the NASCAR win list.

Aaron's 499 

The Aaron's 499 was held on April 25 at Talladega Superspeedway. Ricky Rudd won the pole for the final time in his career.

 Complete results

Top ten results

 24- Jeff Gordon
 8- Dale Earnhardt Jr.
 29- Kevin Harvick
 48- Jimmie Johnson
 31- Robby Gordon
 6- Mark Martin
 99- Jeff Burton
 41- Casey Mears
 42- Jamie McMurray
 18- Bobby Labonte

Failed to qualify: Larry Foyt (#14), Todd Bodine (#98), Kirk Shelmerdine (#72)

 The race ended under controversy when Brian Vickers crashed with four laps to go. At the same time, Jeff Gordon was about to be passed by Dale Earnhardt Jr. As Gordon's car was still ahead of Earnhardt Jr.'s, he kept the lead for the following caution. However, the race never was restarted, and Gordon won the race under the caution, prompting angered fans to throw beverage cups at his car while he celebrated his victory by doing doughnuts on the track. The issue was very similar to the 2002 Indianapolis 500 controversial finish when Hélio Castroneves and Paul Tracy raced when the caution signal was given during Tracy's attempt to pass Castroneves. This led to the implementation of the green-white-checkered finish rule in order to avoid such situations in the future.
 This would be Jeff Gordon's 1st Restrictor Plate win since this event in 2000.

Auto Club 500 

The Auto Club 500 was held on May 2 at California Speedway. Kasey Kahne won the pole.

 Complete results

Top ten results

 24- Jeff Gordon
 48- Jimmie Johnson
 12- Ryan Newman
 17- Matt Kenseth
 18- Bobby Labonte
 77- Brendan Gaughan
 5- Terry Labonte
 41- Casey Mears
 29- Kevin Harvick
 0- Ward Burton

Failed to qualify: none

 The race marked the 19th time in his career that Jeff Gordon won back-to-back races.

Chevy American Revolution 400 

The Chevy American Revolution 400 was held on May 15 at Richmond International Raceway. Brian Vickers won the pole.

 Complete results

Top ten results

 8- Dale Earnhardt Jr.
 48- Jimmie Johnson
 18- Bobby Labonte
 20- Tony Stewart
 17- Matt Kenseth
 24- Jeff Gordon
 6- Mark Martin
 25- Brian Vickers
 12- Ryan Newman
 15- Michael Waltrip

Failed to qualify: Stanton Barrett (#94), Kirk Shelmerdine (#72)

Nextel Open 

The Nextel Open was held on May 22 at Lowe's Motor Speedway. Dave Blaney won the pole.

 Complete results

Top ten results

 40- Sterling Marlin*
 19- Jeremy Mayfield
 42- Jamie McMurray
 43- Jeff Green
 22- Scott Wimmer
 30- Johnny Sauter
 0- Ward Burton
 23- Dave Blaney
 49- Ken Schrader*
 50- Derrike Cope

 Sterling Marlin and Ken Schrader advanced to the All-Star Challenge after this race; Marlin for winning the race, and Schrader for winning the fan vote.

Nextel All-Star Challenge 

The Nextel All-Star Challenge was held on May 22 at Lowe's Motor Speedway. Rusty Wallace won the pole.

 Complete results

 17- Matt Kenseth
 12- Ryan Newman
 20- Tony Stewart
 15- Michael Waltrip
 8- Dale Earnhardt Jr.
 24- Jeff Gordon
 9- Kasey Kahne
 38- Elliott Sadler
 2- Rusty Wallace
 6- Mark Martin

Coca-Cola 600 

The Coca-Cola 600 was held on May 30 at Lowe's Motor Speedway. Jimmie Johnson won the pole.

 Complete results

Top ten results

 48- Jimmie Johnson
 15- Michael Waltrip
 17- Matt Kenseth
 42- Jamie McMurray
 38- Elliott Sadler
 8- Dale Earnhardt Jr.
 41- Casey Mears
 19- Jeremy Mayfield
 20- Tony Stewart
 2- Rusty Wallace

Failed to qualify: Steve Park (#7), Todd Bodine (#37), Carl Long (#46), Stanton Barrett (#94), Geoff Bodine (#98), Morgan Shepherd (#89), Jeff Fultz (#78), Kirk Shelmerdine (#72), Andy Hillenburg (#80)

 Jimmie Johnson won this race in dominating fashion, as he led 334 of the race's 400 laps.

MBNA America 400 "A Salute to Heroes" 

The MBNA America 400 "A Salute to Heroes" was held on June 6 at Dover International Speedway. Jeremy Mayfield won the pole.
 Complete results

Top ten results

 6- Mark Martin
 20- Tony Stewart
 8- Dale Earnhardt Jr.
 99- Jeff Burton
 10- Scott Riggs
 15- Michael Waltrip 1 lap down
 5- Terry Labonte 1 lap down
 19- Jeremy Mayfield 1 lap down
 22- Scott Wimmer 2 laps down
 29- Kevin Harvick 2 laps down

Failed to qualify: Hermie Sadler (#02), Todd Bodine (#37), Larry Gunselman (#98)

 The race snapped a 73-race winless streak for Martin that had been going on since Charlotte in May 2002.
 The race was decimated by a 20-car crash on lap 347 on a restart; one of the largest crashes ever outside of Daytona and Talladega. It started when Dave Blaney was hit by Michael Waltrip.

Pocono 500 

The Pocono 500 was held on June 13 at Pocono Raceway. Kasey Kahne won the pole.

 Complete results

Top ten results

 48- Jimmie Johnson
 19- Jeremy Mayfield
 18- Bobby Labonte
 24- Jeff Gordon
 97- Kurt Busch
 8- Dale Earnhardt Jr.
 5- Terry Labonte
 31- Robby Gordon
 42- Jamie McMurray
 41- Casey Mears

Failed to qualify: Stanton Barrett (#94), Andy Hillenburg (#80)

 This race ended under caution. A fan, upset that the race was ending under caution, threw a cooler at the flagstand and hit the backup flagman. Kevin Harvick and Matt Kenseth were called to the NASCAR hauler after the race following contact under caution.

DHL 400 

The DHL 400 was held on June 20 at Michigan International Speedway. Jeff Gordon won the pole.

 Complete results

Top ten results

 12- Ryan Newman
 9- Kasey Kahne
 88- Dale Jarrett
 48- Jimmie Johnson
 38- Elliott Sadler
 40- Sterling Marlin
 17- Matt Kenseth
 18- Bobby Labonte
 25- Brian Vickers
 15- Michael Waltrip

Failed to qualify: Kerry Earnhardt (#33), Carl Long (#00)

 This race ended under caution.
 Kasey Kahne got his fourth second-place finish of the season.

Dodge/Save Mart 350 

The Dodge/Save Mart 350 was held on June 27 at Infineon Raceway. Jeff Gordon won the pole and led 92 of the 110 laps en route to victory.

 Complete results

Top ten results

 24- Jeff Gordon
 42- Jamie McMurray
 39- Scott Pruett*
 15- Michael Waltrip
 48- Jimmie Johnson
 36- Boris Said*
 41- Casey Mears
 6- Mark Martin
 99- Jeff Burton
 38- Elliott Sadler

Failed to qualify: Morgan Shepherd (#89)

 Scott Pruett picked up a top-five finish after finishing second at Watkins Glen the previous year and was the only road course ace to lead laps in the race.
 Boris Said matched his best career Cup finish in the part-time #36 Chevrolet.

Pepsi 400 

The Pepsi 400 was held on July 3 at Daytona International Speedway. Jeff Gordon won the pole.

 Complete results

Top ten results

 24- Jeff Gordon
 48- Jimmie Johnson
 8- Dale Earnhardt Jr.
 97- Kurt Busch
 20- Tony Stewart
 6- Mark Martin
 18- Bobby Labonte
 5- Terry Labonte
 25- Brian Vickers
 01- Joe Nemechek

Failed to qualify: Chad Blount (#37), Tony Raines (#23), Derrike Cope (#94), Kirk Shelmerdine (#72), Eric McClure (#04), Kenny Wallace (#00)
 The start of the race was delayed more than 30 minutes due to rain and the race started under yellow to help the track dry from the rain.
 8 cars sported Coca-Cola C2 liveries, which were driven by John Andretti, Greg Biffle, Tony Stewart, Ricky Rudd, Kevin Harvick, Kurt Busch, Bill Elliott, and Jeff Burton.
 This was the second Pepsi 400 televised by Fox.
 This race marked the 20th time in his career that Jeff Gordon won back-to-back races.
 Jeff Gordon became the 1st driver in NASCAR history to win from his 50th career pole.

Tropicana 400 

The Tropicana 400 was held on July 11 at Chicagoland Speedway. Jeff Gordon won the pole for the 4th consecutive race. This was the first time since Darrell Waltrip in 1981 that a driver won 4 consecutive poles in a season.

 Complete results

Top ten results

 20- Tony Stewart
 48- Jimmie Johnson
 88- Dale Jarrett
 24- Jeff Gordon
 19- Jeremy Mayfield
 5- Terry Labonte
 40- Sterling Marlin
 01- Joe Nemechek
 15- Michael Waltrip
 29- Kevin Harvick

Failed to qualify: Todd Bodine (#98), Greg Sacks (#13), Kirk Shelmerdine (#72)

 This race is known for a pit road fight that occurred between crew members of Kasey Kahne and Tony Stewart after Stewart spun Kahne, causing a crash that also collected Dale Earnhardt Jr., John Andretti, Dave Blaney, Jeff Burton, and Scott Riggs. All of the pit crew, crew chiefs (Tommy Baldwin Jr. and Greg Zipadelli) and owners (Ray Evernham and Joe Gibbs) of the #9 and #20 were fined $50,000 for their actions. Stewart was not penalized.

Siemens 300 

The Siemens 300 was held on July 25 at New Hampshire International Speedway. Ryan Newman won the pole.

 Complete results

Top ten results

 97- Kurt Busch
 24- Jeff Gordon
 12- Ryan Newman
 17- Matt Kenseth
 20- Tony Stewart
 15- Michael Waltrip
 42- Jamie McMurray
 9- Kasey Kahne
 88- Dale Jarrett
 19- Jeremy Mayfield

Failed to qualify: Kevin Lepage (#51), Kyle Busch (#84), Ryan McGlynn (#00)

Pennsylvania 500 

The Pennsylvania 500 was held on August 1 at Pocono Raceway. Casey Mears won the pole.

 Complete results

Top ten results

 48- Jimmie Johnson
 6- Mark Martin
 9- Kasey Kahne
 16- Greg Biffle
 24- Jeff Gordon
 5- Terry Labonte
 31- Robby Gordon
 17- Matt Kenseth
 19- Jeremy Mayfield
 38- Elliott Sadler

Failed to qualify: Kevin Lepage (#51), Andy Hillenburg (#37), A. J. Henriksen (#90)
 This was the second straight race that Dale Earnhardt Jr. was replaced by John Andretti after Martin Truex Jr. at Loudon one week earlier because he suffered second-and third-degree burns on his neck, chin and legs from a burning car during the practice for the American Le Mans Series Grand Prix of Sonoma at Infineon Raceway and prevented him from finishing the race at Loudon and Pocono.

Brickyard 400 

The Brickyard 400 was held on August 8 at Indianapolis Motor Speedway. Casey Mears won the pole.

 Complete results

Top ten results

 24- Jeff Gordon
 88- Dale Jarrett
 38- Elliott Sadler
 9- Kasey Kahne
 20- Tony Stewart
 16- Greg Biffle
 42- Jamie McMurray
 29- Kevin Harvick
 91- Bill Elliott
 97- Kurt Busch

Failed to qualify: Kevin Lepage (#51), Hermie Sadler (#02), Morgan Shepherd (#89), Greg Sacks (#13), Andy Hillenburg (#37), Geoff Bodine (#34), Kirk Shelmerdine (#72)

 Jeff Gordon became the first 4 time NASCAR winner at the Brickyard oval, and the only driver to do so until Jimmie Johnson in 2012. Gordon would join A. J. Foyt, Al Unser, Rick Mears, and as of 2021 Helio Castroneves as the only 4-time winners in the entire history of Indianapolis Motor Speedway oval.
 This race marked the first time that the green-white-checkered finish rule came into play. The race was extended after Brian Vickers and Ryan Newman crashed on lap 158. However, when Ricky Rudd crashed on lap 160, the race still ended under caution.
 Last career top 10 finish for Bill Elliott.

Sirius Satellite Radio at The Glen 

The Sirius Satellite Radio at The Glen was held on August 15 at Watkins Glen International. Jimmie Johnson started on the pole after qualifying was rained out and set to the current owners points.

 Complete results

Top ten results

 20- Tony Stewart
 1- Ron Fellows*
 6- Mark Martin
 41- Casey Mears
 8- Dale Earnhardt Jr.
 29- Kevin Harvick
 19- Jeremy Mayfield
 21- Ricky Rudd
 17- Matt Kenseth
 97- Kurt Busch

Failed to qualify: Scott Pruett (#39), Boris Said (#36), Klaus Graf (#59), Stanton Barrett (#52)

Tony Stewart put up a spectacular race, narrowly beating Ron Fellows for the win.
 Ron Fellows matched his best career finish in a Cup Series race after starting 43rd in the race.
 This was Jeff Burton's final start for Roush Racing before moving to Richard Childress Racing at Michigan the following week after he signed a three-year contract with Richard Childress Racing just before the race at Watkins Glen. Carl Edwards would take over the 99 car the following week, while Burton would move to the #30 RCR entry for the remainder of the season before taking over the #31 entry at the start of the 2005 season.
 Tony Ave made his first NASCAR Cup start in this race.

GFS Marketplace 400 

The GFS Marketplace 400 was held on August 22 at Michigan International Speedway. Jimmie Johnson started on the pole after qualifying was rained out.

 Complete results

Top ten results

 16- Greg Biffle
 6- Mark Martin
 88- Dale Jarrett
 42- Jamie McMurray
 9- Kasey Kahne
 97- Kurt Busch
 24- Jeff Gordon
 17- Matt Kenseth
 20- Tony Stewart
 99- Carl Edwards

Failed to qualify: Kevin Lepage (#51), Kerry Earnhardt (#33), Kyle Busch (#84), Kenny Wallace (#00), J. J. Yeley (#11), Mike Wallace (#35), Stan Boyd (#79), Stanton Barrett (#37)

 All five Roush Racing cars finished in the top 10.
 This was Carl Edwards' first start in the Nextel Cup Series as well as his first ever top ten finish.

Sharpie 500 

The Sharpie 500 was held on August 28 at Bristol Motor Speedway. Jeff Gordon won the pole.

 Complete results

Top ten results

 8- Dale Earnhardt Jr.
 12- Ryan Newman
 48- Jimmie Johnson
 30- Jeff Burton
 38- Elliott Sadler
 40- Sterling Marlin
 42- Jamie McMurray
 97- Kurt Busch
 17- Matt Kenseth
 88- Dale Jarrett

Failed to qualify: Hermie Sadler (#02), Stanton Barrett (#52), Brad Teague (#72), Tony Ave (#80), Ryan McGlynn (#00)

Dale Earnhardt Jr. scores his only win at Bristol. He also scored the win on August 28, 5 years to the day that his father, Dale Earnhardt, scored his 9th and final win at Bristol. August 28 is also his sister Kelley's birthday.
 In his victory lane interview, Earnhardt Jr. coined the popular phrase, "It's Bristol, Baby!".

Pop Secret 500 

The inaugural Pop Secret 500 was held on September 5 at California Speedway. Brian Vickers won the pole.

 Complete results

Top ten results
 38- Elliott Sadler*
 9- Kasey Kahne
 6- Mark Martin
 42- Jamie McMurray
 12- Ryan Newman
 99- Carl Edwards
 10- Scott Riggs
 88- Dale Jarrett
 31- Robby Gordon
 2- Rusty Wallace

Failed to qualify: Morgan Shepherd (#89), Kirk Shelmerdine (#72), Hermie Sadler (#02), Kevin Lepage (#37), Mike Wallace (#35)

 Portions of this race were filmed for the movie Herbie Fully Loaded.
Kasey Kahne got his fifth second-place finish of the season.
 This was the only time Elliott Sadler would win multiple races in one season in his Cup career. It also turned out to be the final win of his Cup career.

Chevy Rock and Roll 400 

The Chevy Rock and Roll 400 was held on September 11 at Richmond International Raceway. Ryan Newman won the pole.

 Complete results

Top ten results

 19- Jeremy Mayfield
 8- Dale Earnhardt Jr.
 24- Jeff Gordon
 80- Mike Bliss
 6- Mark Martin
 99- Carl Edwards
 09- Mike Wallace
 16- Greg Biffle
 42- Jamie McMurray
 2- Rusty Wallace

Failed to qualify: Johnny Sauter (#33), Tony Raines (#51), Kevin Lepage (#37), Greg Sacks (#13), Hermie Sadler (#02), Brad Teague (#92), Ryan McGlynn (#00), Morgan Shepherd (#89), Carl Long (#80)
 This race was notable when Jeremy Mayfield gained five positions from 14th to 9th and clinched the spot in the Chase.
 This race marked the only cup career top 5 for Mike Bliss as he finished 4th.

Making The Chase - Starting with this year, and every year following until 2017, the fall race at Richmond served as the end of the Cup Series' regular season and as the cut off for making the Chase for the Cup. The Chase field for 2004 consisted of the following drivers:

 24 - Jeff Gordon
 48 - Jimmie Johnson
 8 - Dale Earnhardt Jr.
 20 - Tony Stewart
 17 - Matt Kenseth
 38 - Elliott Sadler
 97 - Kurt Busch
 6 - Mark Martin
 19 - Jeremy Mayfield
 12 - Ryan Newman

Chase for the Nextel Cup

Sylvania 300 

The Sylvania 300 was held on September 19 at New Hampshire International Speedway. Despite the rain washing out the qualifying, the starting lineup was set by owner's points, and Jeff Gordon started on the pole.

 Complete results

Top ten results

 97- Kurt Busch
 17- Matt Kenseth
 8- Dale Earnhardt Jr.
 9- Kasey Kahne
 42- Jamie McMurray
 01- Joe Nemechek
 24- Jeff Gordon
 38- Elliott Sadler
 15- Michael Waltrip
 29- Kevin Harvick

Failed to qualify: Kevin Lepage (#37), Martin Truex Jr. (#1), Johnny Sauter (#33), Greg Sacks (#13), Ryan McGlynn (#00), Carl Long (#46), Tony Raines (#92), Stan Boyd (#79)

This was the first race of the new 10-race playoff format.

MBNA America 400 

The MBNA America 400 was held on September 26 at Dover International Speedway. Jeremy Mayfield won the pole.

 Complete results

Top ten results

 12- Ryan Newman
 6- Mark Martin
 24- Jeff Gordon
 88- Dale Jarrett
 97- Kurt Busch
 20- Tony Stewart
 19- Jeremy Mayfield
 42- Jamie McMurray
 8- Dale Earnhardt Jr.
 48- Jimmie Johnson

Failed to qualify: Hermie Sadler (#02), Derrike Cope (#80), Greg Sacks (#13), Carl Long (#00), Kenny Hendrick (#35), Stanton Barrett (#92), Mike Garvey (#75)

 Ryan Newman ran away with the win in this race, leading 325 of 400 laps and winning by a margin of 8.149 seconds.

EA Sports 500 

The EA Sports 500 was held on October 3 at Talladega Superspeedway. Joe Nemechek won the pole.

 Complete results

Top ten results

 8- Dale Earnhardt Jr.
 29- Kevin Harvick
 88- Dale Jarrett
 77- Brendan Gaughan
 97- Kurt Busch
 20- Tony Stewart
 01- Joe Nemechek
 41- Casey Mears
 31- Robby Gordon
 0- Ward Burton

Failed to qualify: Kevin Lepage (#37), Kirk Shelmerdine (#72), Carl Long (#80)

 At the finish line, on the last lap, Elliott Sadler flipped over just as he had done in the same race in 2003. He was uninjured, though.
 Although he won the race, Dale Earnhardt Jr. was later penalized 25 points for uttering an obscenity during his post-race interview on NBC.
 This was the first play-by-play appearance for Bill Weber, due to Allen Bestwick's injury during a hockey match.
 Last career top 10 finish for Ward Burton.

Banquet 400 presented by ConAgra Foods 

The Banquet 400 presented by ConAgra Foods was held on October 10 at Kansas Speedway. Joe Nemechek won the pole.

 Complete results

Top ten results

 01- Joe Nemechek
 21- Ricky Rudd
 16- Greg Biffle
 38- Elliott Sadler
 19- Jeremy Mayfield
 97- Kurt Busch
 42- Jamie McMurray
 88- Dale Jarrett
 8- Dale Earnhardt Jr.
 77- Brendan Gaughan

Failed to qualify: Mike Garvey (#75), Mike Wallace (#35), Carl Long (#00), Morgan Shepherd (#89)

 This would be the 4th and final career victory for Joe Nemechek. As of 2018, Nemechek is the only driver to score every single win with every different team. His 1st career win was in the 42, driving for SABCO Racing at Loudon in 1999. His 2nd career win was in the 33, driving for Andy Petree Racing at Rockingham in 2001. His 3rd career win was in the 25, driving for Hendrick Motorsports at Richmond in 2003. Finally, his 4th and final career win was in the 01, driving for MB2 Motorsports in this race at Kansas. The one thing in common with all 4 different teams, however, was that all 4 wins were in a Chevrolet. Nemechek is also one of two drivers to score his final Busch Series win and Cup Series win in the same weekend. He won the Mr. Goodcents 300 the previous day. The only other driver to accomplish this feat was in 1988 when Bobby Allison won the Goody's 300 and the Daytona 500.
 The three branches of the United States military that were sponsors at the time finished 1-2-3 (Army, Air Force, National Guard).

UAW-GM Quality 500 

The UAW-GM Quality 500 was held on October 16 at Lowe's Motor Speedway. Ryan Newman won the pole.

 Complete results

Top ten results

 48- Jimmie Johnson
 24- Jeff Gordon
 8- Dale Earnhardt Jr.
 97- Kurt Busch
 01- Joe Nemechek
 88- Dale Jarrett
 38- Elliott Sadler
 42- Jamie McMurray
 30- Jeff Burton
 20- Tony Stewart

Failed to qualify: Kenny Wallace (#00), Derrike Cope (#94), Mike Wallace (#35), Carl Long (#00), Kirk Shelmerdine (#72), Larry Foyt (#59), Hermie Sadler (#02), Morgan Shepherd (#89), Geoff Bodine (#98)

With the win, Jimmie Johnson swept the two Charlotte races in 2004.

Subway 500 

The Subway 500 was held on October 24 at Martinsville Speedway. Ryan Newman won the pole.

 Complete results

Top ten results

 48- Jimmie Johnson
 42- Jamie McMurray
 12- Ryan Newman
 40- Sterling Marlin
 97- Kurt Busch
 19- Jeremy Mayfield
 43- Jeff Green
 29- Kevin Harvick
 24- Jeff Gordon
 2- Rusty Wallace

Failed to qualify: Carl Long (#46), Brad Teague (#94), Greg Sacks (#13), Ryan McGlynn (#00), Morgan Shepherd (#89), Mike Garvey (#75), Klaus Graf (#59)

 The victory lane celebration was canceled after a tragic plane crash that took the lives of key personnel in the Hendrick Motorsports stable.

Bass Pro Shops MBNA 500 

The Bass Pro Shops MBNA 500 was held on October 31 at Atlanta Motor Speedway. Ryan Newman won the pole.

 Complete results

Top ten results

 48- Jimmie Johnson
 6- Mark Martin
 99- Carl Edwards
 01- Joe Nemechek
 9- Kasey Kahne
 30- Jeff Burton
 25- Brian Vickers
 42- Jamie McMurray
 20- Tony Stewart
 16- Greg Biffle

Failed to qualify: Scott Riggs (#10), Scott Wimmer (#22), Kerry Earnhardt (#33), Johnny Sauter (#09), Hermie Sadler (#02), Mike Wallace (#4), Derrike Cope (#94), Randy LaJoie (#98), Greg Sacks (#13), Larry Foyt (#59), Kirk Shelmerdine (#72), Morgan Shepherd (#89), Andy Belmont (#80), Larry Hollenbeck (#62), Kenny Wallace (#00)

 Johnson won the race just one week after a plane crash that killed ten people involved with Hendrick Motorsports including Rick Hendrick's son Ricky. The four Hendrick teammates drove a special paint scheme for the remainder of the season to honor those involved in the crash.
 Johnson became the first driver since Jeff Gordon (last 2 races in 1998 and the 1999 Daytona 500) to win 3 races in a row.

Checker Auto Parts 500 

The Checker Auto Parts 500 was held on November 7 at Phoenix International Raceway. Ryan Newman won the pole. The race at Phoenix was very cloudy and a short chance of rain in cold weather.

 Complete results

Top ten results

 8- Dale Earnhardt Jr.
 12- Ryan Newman
 24- Jeff Gordon
 29- Kevin Harvick
 9- Kasey Kahne
 48- Jimmie Johnson
 2- Rusty Wallace
 20- Tony Stewart
 18- Bobby Labonte
 97- Kurt Busch

Failed to qualify: Mike Garvey (#75), Tony Raines (#51), Stanton Barrett (#94), Mario Gosselin (#80), Ryan McGlynn (#00), Geoff Bodine (#93), Kirk Shelmerdine (#72)

 The race was extended to 315 laps / 315 miles due to a green-white-checkered finish.
 After two straight 33rd-place finishes at Martinsville due to a blown engine and Atlanta due to an accident on lap 310, Dale Earnhardt Jr. won the race for the sixth time in this season that puts Earnhardt Jr. from fifth to third in the points standings with two races left in this season.
 Ryan Newman won the pole for the 4th consecutive race. As of 2020, Ryan Newman is the last driver to win 4 straight pole positions. Also, as of 2020, 2004 is the only season in NASCAR history that 2 drivers won 4 straight pole positions in a single season (Jeff Gordon did it at Michigan, Sonoma, Daytona, and Chicagoland).

Mountain Dew Southern 500 

The Mountain Dew Southern 500 was held on November 14 at Darlington Raceway. Qualifying was canceled due to rain and the starting lineup was set by owner's points so Kurt Busch won the pole. 

 Complete results

Top ten results

 48- Jimmie Johnson
 6- Mark Martin
 24- Jeff Gordon
 42- Jamie McMurray
 9- Kasey Kahne
 97- Kurt Busch
 99- Carl Edwards
 01- Joe Nemechek
 18- Bobby Labonte
 0- Mike Bliss

Failed to qualify: Kevin Lepage (#37), John Andretti (#14), Derrike Cope (#94), Carl Long (#00), Travis Kvapil (#06)
 With this win, Jimmie Johnson became the first driver since Dale Earnhardt in 1987 to pull off the season sweep at 3 different tracks in one season. Along with Darlington, Johnson pulled off season sweeps at Pocono and Charlotte. However, Bill Elliott is the only driver in NASCAR history to pull off the season sweep at 4 different tracks in one season, with the tracks being Pocono, Michigan, Darlington, and Atlanta, back in 1985.
This would be the last Darlington race with the "Southern 500" name until 2009.
Tony Stewart and Ryan Newman were eliminated from Chase contention by being greater than 156 points behind the points leader.

Ford 400 

The Ford 400 was held on November 21 at Homestead-Miami Speedway. Kurt Busch won the pole.

 Complete results

Top ten results

 16- Greg Biffle
 48- Jimmie Johnson
 24- Jeff Gordon
 20- Tony Stewart
 97- Kurt Busch
 77- Brendan Gaughan
 42- Jamie McMurray
 2- Rusty Wallace
 21- Ricky Rudd
 29- Kevin Harvick

Failed to qualify: Kyle Petty (#45), Johnny Sauter (#09), Mike Garvey (#75), Tony Raines (#51), Kevin Lepage (#37), Todd Bodine (#50), Larry Foyt (#70), J. J. Yeley (#11), Randy LaJoie (#98), Morgan Shepherd (#89), Kirk Shelmerdine (#72), Carl Long (#80), Geoff Bodine (#93)

This race was known as the deciding race of the 2004 Nextel Cup champion, in which five drivers were still mathematically alive for the championship including the points leader, Kurt Busch with an 18-point margin ahead of Jimmie Johnson, who earned the most wins in 2004, Jeff Gordon, Dale Earnhardt Jr., and veteran Mark Martin. Those five chasers were separated by an 82-point margin from first to fifth for the final race. At the start of lap 1, Hermie Sadler got turned sideways while Mike Bliss was spun around but Johnson survived the wreck in the following caution. On lap 93, championship leader Kurt Busch lost a tire when he entered pit road, he lost the championship lead to Jeff Gordon, though Busch took back the points lead. With 3 laps to go, race leader Ryan Newman made some contact and lost the right side of the tire, the caution was out and set up a Green-white-checkered finish at Homestead. At the restart, Greg Biffle held off the hard-charging Hendrick teams of Jimmie Johnson and Jeff Gordon for the race lead and took the checkered flag to win the Ford 400, while Johnson and Gordon finished 2nd and 3rd. Kurt Busch won the 2004 NASCAR NEXTEL Cup Championship with 8 points ahead of Johnson, the closest margin in Cup history (until the 2011 season, won by Tony Stewart. Stewart and Carl Edwards were tied following the 2011 season's last race, the Cup going to Stewart by virtue of more wins on the season, 5 to 1 respectively.)
 In victory lane, Busch dedicated his championship to the Hendrick family because of the plane crash four weeks prior at the Martinsville race.
 Kurt Busch would become the 6th different champion in the last 6 years, a NASCAR Modern Era record, which would later be tied with the 2016-2021 seasons.

Full Drivers' Championship 

(key) Bold - Pole position awarded by time. Italics - Pole position set by owner's points standings. * – Most laps led.

Rookie of the Year 
The Rookie of the year battle in 2004 marked the first time since 1998 that a rookie driver did not visit victory lane. The winner of the battle was dark horse candidate Kasey Kahne, who went from a 41st-place finish at the season opening Daytona 500, to being narrowly defeated by Matt Kenseth the next week at Rockingham, and he never looked back, grabbing fourteen top ten finishes and thirteen top-five finishes, as well as a couple of pole positions. Pre-season favorites Scott Wimmer and Brian Vickers struggled, although Wimmer placed third in the Daytona 500, but neither made competitive strides during the season. Brendan Gaughan was a pleasant surprise, posting four top tens and finishing runner-up to Kahne for the award, while Scott Riggs only had two-top ten finishes. The only other rookie, Johnny Sauter, was released from his ride mid-season and never made a challenge for the top honor.

See also 
 2004 NASCAR Busch Series
 2004 NASCAR Craftsman Truck Series
 2004 Chase for the Nextel Cup

References

External links 
 Racing Reference 

 
NASCAR Cup Series seasons